Tamara Molinaro (born 10 October 1997) is an Italian rally driver who currently serves as the official championship reserve driver for the Extreme E. She won the FIA European Rally Championship Ladies' Trophy in 2017 before moving on to World Rally Championship-2, TitansRX and the Italian Gravel Championship, where she is a double ladies' champion. She has also occasionally competed as a co-driver, most notably partnering Craig Breen in selected Italian and Sammarinese rounds.

Biography 
Molinaro began rallying in 2008 at the age of 11 under the mentorship of long-time family friend Gigi Galli, and started her career as a co-driver for Galli and Swiss driver Luca Maspoli. She was picked up by Red Bull early on in her career as one of their sponsored athletes.

Molinaro progressed into driving in 2013, competing in several regional rallies in Italy, aboard a Citroën C2. In 2016 she switched the Citroën for an Opel Adam R2, taking part in a series of Austrian and German events alongside Ilka Minor. The following year she entered the FIA European Rally Championship in the same car, coming seventh in the Junior U27 and winning the title in the Ladies' Trophy.

2017 would also see Molinaro make her World Rally Championship debut, coming 49th at the Rallye Deutschland alongside Veronica Gulbæk Engan. She also co-drove for Craig Breen for the first time, at the Monza Rally Show in December. In 2018 she entered a single ERC event at the Rallye Açores, and made a further WRC appearance at the Rally Sweden, both in a Ford Fiesta R5 co-driven by Martijn Wydaeghe. She repeated at the Rally Sweden the following season in a Citroën C3 R5 together with Lorenzo Granai, achieving her best championship result with 28th place overall and 11th place in WRC-2.

Molinaro's main programme for 2019 though was a rallycross debut in the newly rebranded TitansRX International Europe Series, where she finished fifth in a Hyundai i30, in a championship won by WRX event-winner Kevin Hansen. In 2020 and 2021 Molinaro contested the Italian Gravel Championship, where she finished tenth and seventh respectively, winning the ladies' trophy in both cases.

In July 2021, Molinaro joined the new electric off-road racing series Extreme E as the championship's female reserve driver, after her predecessor Jutta Kleinschmidt was signed by Abt Cupra XE for the remainder of the season. Molinaro remained in the role into 2022, where she got her debut at the season-opening Desert X-Prix in Saudi Arabia, replacing Xite Energy Racing's Klara Andersson, who had tested positive for COVID-19. She impressed, outpacing teammate Oliver Bennett and almost qualifying for the final race.

Racing record

Complete WRC results

Complete WRC-2 results

Complete Extreme E results
(key)

* Season still in progress.

References

External links 
 Tamara Molinaro's e-wrc profile

1997 births
Living people
Italian female racing drivers
Italian rally drivers
European Rally Championship drivers
Female rally drivers
Sportspeople from Como
World Rally Championship drivers
Extreme E drivers